Galex may refer to:
GALEX, an ultraviolet space telescope 
Galex (pharmaceutical company), a Slovenian company 
Galaxy Express Corporation (GALEX), Japanese rocket company
Galex (gas company), a French company specializing in gases and related equipment
Galex (sportswear company), an Italian sportswear company

See also
GALLEX, a germanium neutrino experiment